Mostafa Musallami is an Iranian former footballer who played as a defender for the Taj SC.

References

External links
 

1950 births
Living people
Iranian footballers
Esteghlal F.C. players
Association football defenders
Iran international footballers